Laughing Boy is a 1934 pre-Code film directed by W.S. Van Dyke and is based on the 1929 Pulitzer Prize-winning novel of the same name by Oliver La Farge.

Plot
Slim Girl is an Indian maiden raised by whites, who call her Lily. Many members of the Navajo tribe shun Slim Girl, believing her to be leading an improper life, perhaps even as a prostitute.

Laughing Boy, a silversmith, is seduced by her. After losing a horse race, he challenges rival Red Man to a wrestling match and wins. This impresses Slim Girl, who expresses her desire for him. She returns to her previous intimate relationship, however, with George Hartshorne, a rich rancher.

One day Slim Girl seeks out Laughing Boy, becomes his lover, and persuades him to marry her. But when she goes to town to sell his silver goods, Laughing Boy follows and finds her in Hartshorne's arms. He fires an arrow at Hartshorne but ends up killing Slim Girl instead.

Main cast

Reception
The film was a box-office disappointment for MGM.

References

External links

 
 

1934 films
1934 romantic drama films
American black-and-white films
American romantic drama films
Films about Native Americans
Films based on American novels
Films directed by W. S. Van Dyke
Films scored by Herbert Stothart
Metro-Goldwyn-Mayer films
1930s English-language films
1930s American films